DnaJ homolog subfamily C member 7 is a protein that in humans is encoded by the DNAJC7 gene.

Interactions 

DNAJC7 has been shown to interact with RAD9A.

References

Further reading

Heat shock proteins